The Night Agent is an upcoming American action thriller television series created by Shawn Ryan based on the novel of the same name by Matthew Quirk. It is scheduled to premiere on Netflix on March 23, 2023.

Plot
FBI Agent Peter Sutherland is thrown into a vast conspiracy about a Russian mole at the highest levels of the United States government. To save the nation, Peter plunges into a desperate hunt for the traitor, while working with the terrorized CEO Rose Larkin and protecting her from the people she called her aunt and uncle.

Cast
 Gabriel Basso as Peter Sutherland
 Luciane Buchanan as Rose Larkin
 Hong Chau as Diane Farr
 D. B. Woodside as Erik Monks
 Fola Evans-Akingbola as Chelsea Arrington
 Eve Harlow as Ellen
 Phoenix Raei as Dale
 Enrique Murciano as Ben Almora
 Sarah Desjardins as Maddie Redfield

Episodes

Production

Development
On December 24, 2020, it was revealed that Sony Pictures Television is set to produce the TV series adaptation of Matthew Quirk's novel The Night Agent, with Shawn Ryan set to write the series. On July 21, 2021, the series was acquired by Netflix, with Seth Gordon set to direct the pilot and produce the 10 episode series with Ryan, Marney Hochman, Julia Gunn, James Vanderbilt, William Sherak, Paul Neinstein, Nicole Tossou, and David Beaubaire.

Casting
On November 22, 2021, Gabriel Basso and Luciane Buchanan were cast in the series. On February 1, 2022, Hong Chau, D. B. Woodside, Fola Evans-Akingbola, Eve Harlow, Phoenix Raei, Enrique Murciano, and Sarah Desjardins joined the cast as series regulars. On February 24, 2023, Kari Matchett joined the cast in a recurring role.

References

External links
 

2020s American drama television series

American action television series
American thriller television series
English-language Netflix original programming
Television series about conspiracy theories
Television shows based on American novels
Television series by Sony Pictures Television
Upcoming drama television series
Upcoming Netflix original programming